Zachary M. Burdi (born March 9, 1995) is an American professional baseball pitcher in the Tampa Bay Rays organization. He has played in Major League Baseball (MLB) for the Chicago White Sox and Baltimore Orioles. He made his MLB debut in 2020.

Career

Amateur career
Burdi attended Downers Grove South High School in Downers Grove, Illinois, where he played for the school's baseball team as a pitcher. He then enrolled at the University of Louisville, where he played college baseball for the Louisville Cardinals. In 2014, he played collegiate summer baseball with the Chatham Anglers of the Cape Cod Baseball League.

Chicago White Sox
The Chicago White Sox selected Burdi as the 26th pick in the first round of the 2016 Major League Baseball Draft. After he signed with the White Sox, Burdi made one appearance with the Arizona White Sox of the Rookie-level Arizona League, four appearances with the Winston-Salem Dash of the Class A-Advanced Carolina League, 12 appearances for the Birmingham Barons of the Class AA Southern League, and was then promoted to the Charlotte Knights of the Class AAA International League. He finished his first professional season with a 1–0 record and a 3.32 ERA, with 51 strikeouts in 38 innings pitched between the four clubs. Burdi spent all of 2017 with Charlotte, posting an 0–4 record with a 4.05 ERA.

Burdi was added to the White Sox 40–man roster following the 2019 season.

On August 8, 2020, Burdi was called up to the major leagues and made his major league debut that night, pitching a scoreless inning against the Cleveland Indians. With the 2020 Chicago White Sox, Burdi appeared in 8 games, compiling a 0–1 record with 11.05 ERA and 11 strikeouts in  innings pitched.

Burdi appeared in 6 games for the White Sox in 2021, posting an ERA of 6.00 with 6 strikeouts over 9 innings. On August 16, 2021, Burdi was designated for assignment by the White Sox.

Baltimore Orioles
On August 18, 2021, Burdi was claimed off of waivers by the Baltimore Orioles. He was assigned to the Triple-A Norfolk Tides. Burdi logged one scoreless appearance for Baltimore and posted a 2.25 ERA in 4 games for Norfolk to round out the year.

Washington Nationals
On October 15, 2021, Burdi was claimed off of waivers by the Arizona Diamondbacks. He was released on March 14, 2022.

On April 21, 2022, Burdi signed a minor league deal with the Washington Nationals. Burdi appeared in only eight games for the High-A Wilmington Blue Rocks, recording a 1.74 ERA with 10 strikeouts in 10.1 innings of work, making two scoreless appearances for the rookie-level Florida Complex League Nationals as well. He elected free agency on November 10, 2022.

Tampa Bay Rays
On January 18, 2023, Burdi signed a minor league contract with the Tampa Bay Rays organization.

Personal life
His brother, Nick Burdi, also plays professional baseball.

References

External links

1995 births
Living people
People from Downers Grove, Illinois
Baseball players from Illinois
Major League Baseball pitchers
Chicago White Sox players
Baltimore Orioles players
Louisville Cardinals baseball players
Chatham Anglers players
Arizona League White Sox players
Kannapolis Intimidators players
Winston-Salem Dash players
Birmingham Barons players
Charlotte Knights players
Glendale Desert Dogs players